El Kantara District is a district of Biskra Province, Algeria.

Municipalities
The district has 2 municipalities:
El Kantara
Ain Zaatout

References

Districts of Biskra Province